More Than Fine is a song by the alternative rock band Switchfoot. It was released on their 2003 double-platinum record, The Beautiful Letdown. It was released as the album's lead single to the contemporary Christian music market through Sparrow Records, while the song "Meant to Live" was shipped to mainstream and alternative radio station formats by Columbia Records/Red Ink. Soon after release, it became the band's first No. 1 single on Christian Contemporary hit radio.

References

Switchfoot songs
2003 songs
Sparrow Records singles
Songs written by Tim Foreman
Songs written by Jon Foreman
Song recordings produced by John Fields (record producer)